Cheliomyrmex is a New World genus of army ants in the subfamily Dorylinae. In Central America, C. morosus is known from Mexico to Honduras, and Panama. C. andicola, C. audax, C. ursinus and C. megalonyx are known from Colombia and further into South America.

Species
 Cheliomyrmex andicola Emery, 1894
 Cheliomyrmex audax Santschi, 1921
 Cheliomyrmex megalonyx Wheeler, 1921
 Cheliomyrmex morosus (Smith, 1859)

References

External links

Dorylinae
Ant genera
Hymenoptera of North America
Hymenoptera of South America